John Sack (March 24, 1930 – March 27, 2004) was an American literary journalist and war correspondent. He was the only journalist to cover each American war over half a century.

Biography
Sack was born in New York City. His work appeared in such periodicals as Harper's, The Atlantic, Esquire and The New Yorker. He was a war correspondent in Korea, Vietnam, Iraq, Afghanistan and the former Yugoslavia.

A reporter, researcher and later a stringer for CBS News in Spain, he authored ten books, including the controversial title An Eye for an Eye: The Untold Story of Jewish Revenge Against Germans in 1945, which described cases of persecution of Germans by Jews in post–World War II Polish internment camps.

Death
He died on March 27, 2004, three days after his 74th birthday, from prostate cancer in San Francisco, California, according to his New York Times obituary. He was survived by a sister, Lois Edelstein.

Publications
 1952: The Butcher: The Ascent of Yerupajá  New York: Rinehart & Co.   Library of Congress Catalog Card Number 52-7159
 1959: Report from Practically Nowhere 
 1971: Lieutenant Calley: his own story; [as told to] John Sack.  New York: Viking Press. 	 
 1971: Body count: Lieutenant Calley's story; as told to John Sack. London: Hutchinson, 1971. 
 1982: Fingerprint. New York: Random House 
 1985: M. New York: Avon Books.   Reissued in 1986 by Corgi Children's.
 1993: An Eye for an Eye. New York, NY: BasicBooks (about Lola Potok Ackerfeld Blatt) 
 1995: Company C: the real war in Iraq. New York: William Morrow;

References

External links
 
 "John Sack, 74, Correspondent Who Reported From Battlefields" by Christopher Lehmann-Haupt, The New York Times, March 31, 2004
 Obituary in Esquire
 1966 Esquire article "M", aka "Oh my God — we hit a little girl."

1930 births
2004 deaths
American male journalists
Deaths from prostate cancer
Deaths from cancer in California
Jewish American writers
American war correspondents
20th-century American journalists
20th-century American Jews
21st-century American Jews